The 2000 Tour du Haut Var was the 32nd edition of the Tour du Haut Var cycle race and was held on 19 February 2000. The race started and finished in Draguignan. The race was won by Daniele Nardello.

General classification

References

2000
2000 in road cycling
2000 in French sport
February 2000 sports events in France